
Gmina Janikowo is an urban-rural gmina (administrative district) in Inowrocław County, Kuyavian-Pomeranian Voivodeship, in north-central Poland.

Villages
Apart from the town of Janikowo, Gmina Janikowo contains the villages and settlements of Broniewice, Dobieszewice, Głogówiec, Góry, Kołodziejewo, Kołuda Mała, Kołuda Wielka, Ludzisko, Sielec and Trląg.

Neighbouring gminas
Gmina Janikowo is bordered by the gminas of Dąbrowa, Inowrocław, Mogilno, Pakość and Strzelno.

References
Polish official population figures 2006

Janikowo
Inowrocław County